Rose Connors is an author of mystery fiction. She has written four books about her fictional attorney Marty Nickerson, but hasn't been published in more than ten years. She graduated from Mount St. Mary's College with a degree in American history.

Works
Marty Nickerson Series
Absolute Certainty (2002), won the Mary Higgins Clark Award
Temporary Sanity (2003)
Maximum Security (2004)
False Testimony (2005)

References

Living people
Year of birth missing (living people)
21st-century American novelists
American crime fiction writers
American women novelists
21st-century American women writers
Women crime fiction writers